Atthur is a small village near Gonikoppa in Virajpet Taluk of Kodagu District, Karnataka State, India. It comes under Guhya Panchayath. It belongs to Mysore Division.

Madikeri, Mattannur, Koothuparamba, Mangalore, Peringathur are the nearby cities to Atthur. It is located in the Virajpet taluk of Kodagu district in Karnataka.

Institutes
 Fruit Research Station

People from Attur
 C. M. Poonacha, The only Chief Minister of Coorg, before its merger with Mysore State.

See also
 Kodagu
 Districts of Karnataka

References

External links
 http://Kodagu.nic.in/

Villages in Kodagu district